Monroe Saffold Jr. (born April 12, 1948) is an American educator,  minister, and body builder. During the 1980s and early 1990s, Saffold entered the Masters Mr. America AAU national body building competition and took first place, tall division, in 1990.

Early life
Saffold was born in Lexington, Mississippi but later moved with his family to Chicago in search of better education and financial opportunities. He is the eldest of six children to the union of his father, Monroe Sr. and mother Dixie Saffold. He and his wife Patricia raised two children Brian Saffold and Nicole Saffold Maskiell in Oak Park from 1980 to 2001 and has been a resident of River Forest, Illinois since 2001.

Weight training career
During his teen years, Saffold became serious about weight training to improve his physique for school athletics and build strength and muscle. His earlier training sessions were spent at the Duncan YMCA located on Chicago’s near Westside. Saffold started compete in open bodybuilding and weightlifting tournaments.  Saffold won a number of championships most notably in 1983 where he took third place in the Junior Mr. America AAU and first place in 1990 in the Masters Mr. America AAU competition. He has appeared in several different newscast programs such as WLS-TV sports and WMAQ-Channel 5.  He has also appeared in the press, most notably in the Sunday Chicago Sun-Times and Chicago Tribune.

Education career and the ministry
Saffold attended the University of Illinois at Chicago where he received a B.S. in Physical Education and a minor in Biological Sciences. He later received a M.S. in Adapted and Exercise Physiology at the same university.

He has been teaching for the Chicago Board of Education at Lane Tech Biological Sciences Department for over 30 years and taught at several local colleges including Triton College.

Saffold completed a Master of Arts degree in Christian Ministry from North Park Seminary in 2005. He currently is the Welcome Minister at First Baptist Church of Oak Park.

Contests
1983: Junior Mr. America AAU – 3rd place 
1990: Masters Mr. America AAU  - 1st place

References

1948 births
Living people
American bodybuilders
Sportspeople from Chicago
People from Lexington, Mississippi
University of Illinois Chicago alumni
American clergy
Educators from Illinois